Rav Yeruchom Levovitz (ca. 1875-1936), also known by his hundreds of students simply as The Mashgiach, was a famous mashgiach ruchani and baal mussar (Jewish Ethics) at the Mir yeshiva in Belarus.

Early life

Maran Yeruchom Levovitz was born in 1875 (5635 in the Jewish calendar) in Lyuban,  Minsk Voblast, Belarus (near Slutsk) to Avraham and Chasya Levovitz. He received his education in the yeshivas of Slobodka and Kelm.

He was a disciple of Nosson Tzvi Finkel, and Rav Simcha Zissel Ziv of Kelm.

Mir Yeshiva
R' Yeruchom was the spiritual leader of the Mir Yeshiva in Belarus until his death in 1936. His disciples were said to have followed his every word, never doing anything that they "felt" he would not want them to do. Most of the leaders of the yeshivas of inter-war Poland were Levovits's disciples. They would come on occasion to visit him and seek his advice.

After World War II, much of orthodox Jewry in Europe was wiped out, along with their many yeshivas (Jewish schools of higher learning). One of the only yeshivas to survive as a whole body was the Mir Yeshiva, which managed to escape to Shanghai, China, and then on to America.

Disciples
Some of R' Yeruchom's better known disciples include Simcha Zissel Halevi Levovitz, Avrohom Levovitz, Chaim Shmulevitz, Dovid Povarsky, Isser Yehuda Malin, Aryeh Leib Malin, Abba Berman, Zelik Epstein, Shimon Schwab, Shlomo Wolbe, Zeidel Smiatcky, Aryeh Leib Bakst, Chaim Wysoker, Binyomin Zeilberger, Nachum Patrovitz.

His many discourses and lectures are preserved for posterity in the following sefarim: "Daas Torah," "Daas Chochma U'Mussar," "Shvivai Daas," and "Sifsai Daas on Pirkei Avos" which are a staple of many yeshiva libraries today, as well as many Orthodox Jewish households.

He died on the 18th of Sivan in the year 1936 at the age of sixty-three. He is buried in the town of Mir, Belarus. His grave site (recently rebuilt by his family) is a common destination for the many Jewish tourists who visit the decimated cities of pre-war eastern Europe.

Rebuilding in America
Most of R' Yeruchom's family escaped the Nazis and made it to America where they were pioneers of the rebuilding of Orthodox Jewry in the United States. His son, Rav Simcha Zissel Halevi Levovitz, was the founder of a yeshiva in Boro Park, Brooklyn, and was responsible for publishing the writings of his father, as well as publishing the writings of Rav Simcha Zissel Ziv, the Alter of Kelm. His son-in-law Rav Yisroel Chaim Kaplan, former rosh yeshiva in Brisk, Lithuania, came to America and served as rosh yeshiva in Beth Medrash Elyon in Monsey, NY. Ten of his talmidim convened to open Yeshivas Beis HaTalmud. Reb Leib Maalin served as the rosh yeshiva until his passing when the leadership of the yeshiva was passed to Chaim Wysoker. After R' Chaim's passing, many other Rabbanim tried becoming Rosh Yeshiva, resulting in Rabbi Katz, a Patterson talmid, being there today.

Rav Yeruchom - the Light of the Torah World
“The Light of the Torah World” is a biography that is available for purchase online.

References

Rav Yerucham Levovitz – the mashgiach of the Mir Yeshiva at www.famousrabbis.com
Wolff Rosengarten

Haredi rabbis in Europe
Mashgiach ruchani
1873 births
1936 deaths
Musar movement
Lithuanian Haredi rabbis
Mir mashgiach ruchanis
People from Mir, Belarus